Mariano Aguilar (born 1898, died on June 1977) was a Mexican sprinter who competed in 100 metres and 200 metres at the 1924 Summer Olympics.

References

External links
 

1898 births
Year of death missing
Mexican male sprinters
Olympic athletes of Mexico
Athletes (track and field) at the 1924 Summer Olympics
Central American and Caribbean Games gold medalists for Mexico
Competitors at the 1926 Central American and Caribbean Games
Central American and Caribbean Games medalists in athletics
20th-century Mexican people